Tuusula is a municipality of Finland. It belongs to the Helsinki sub-region of the Uusimaa region. The municipality has a population of 
() and is by far the third largest municipality in Finland after Nurmijärvi and Kirkkonummi that doesn't use the town or city title by itself.

Geography
Tuusula, lying on the shores of Tuusulanjärvi lake, is located in the province of Southern Finland and is part of the Uusimaa region.
which 
is water. The population density is
.

Tuusula has three population centres. The administrative centre is Hyrylä (about 19,500 residents), other two are Jokela (5,300 residents) and Kellokoski (4,300 residents). The remaining  4,400 residents are distributed to the rural areas outside of municipal centres. The most significant main road connection between Hyrylä and Helsinki is the Tuusulanväylä motorway.

The neighbouring communes are Vantaa to the south, Nurmijärvi to the west, Hyvinkää to the north, Mäntsälä and Järvenpää to the north east, and Sipoo and Kerava to the east.

Villages 

Huikko, Hyrylä, Jokela, Jäniksenlinna, Kellokoski, Lahela, Myllykylä, Nahkela, Paijala, Riihikallio, Ruotsinkylä, Ruskela, Rusutjärvi, Savikulma, Siippoo, Vanhakylä

History
The area in what is now Tuusula was located in the larger municipality of Sipoo. In 1643, it became a separate parish in the municipality, and in 1653, it became a separate municipality. Tuusula's boundaries have not always remained the same: in 1924 the municipality of Kerava split from here; in 1950 the municipality of Korso was split between Tuusula, Kerava, and Sipoo; and in 1951 the municipality of Järvenpää split from here.

During the Crimean War (1853–1856), a Russian garrison was stationed in what is now Hyrylä. The modern parish mostly developed around it.

The area had always been a fairly fertile area, thus encouraging farming. The development of other industries began in 1795, when an ironworks was created in Kellokoski that functioned until the 1980s. The establishment of a railway in Jokela furthered the growth.

Soon after this industrial time another aspect of Tuusulan history was realised. The Tuusulanjärvi lake attracted many artists who wanted to paint the beautiful landscape. Following the footsteps of Aleksis Kivi, the Finnish national poet who spent the last years of his life in a hut on the shores of the lake, Jean Sibelius, Juhani Aho, and Pekka Halonen even established their main residences here. Recently these houses have become tourist sites, especially Sibelius' house Ainola. Also, Tuusula Lake Road on the eastern shore of the lake is an outside museum.

The Jokela rail crash was a rail crash which occurred on 21 April 1996 here.

Jokela High School was the site of the Jokela school shooting, a school shooting which occurred on 7 November 2007, leaving 9 dead (including the 18-year-old perpetrator, Pekka-Eric Auvinen).

Notable people
Ilmari Juutilainen, the top flying ace of the Finnish Air Force
Eino Leino, poet
Teemu Suninen, rally driver

Demographics
Tuusula, in the Helsinki suburbs, has been in a positive balance of population, with it more than doubling in size since 1970.

The municipality is officially Finnish. Swedish was the second official language until 1943. Today only 2% are Swedish-speaking.

Population in:
 1970 – 17.235
 1980 – 22.151
 1987 – 26.234
 1990 – 27.328
 1997 – 29.957
 2000 – 31.957
 2007 – 34.890

Politics

Parliamentary elections
Results of the 2019 Finnish parliamentary election in Tuusula:

Finns Party   21%
National Coalition Party   20.4%
Social Democratic Party   16.5%
Centre Party   12.3%
Green League   11.3%
Movement Now   5.3%
Left Alliance   4.8%
Blue Reform   2.6%
Christian Democrats   2%
Other parties   4%

Municipal Council

Twin towns – Sister cities

Tuusula is twinned with:

Economy and Infrastructure

Economy
Due its proximity to the Helsinki, Tuusula is, for the most part, a commuter town. Tuusula itself has around 10,000 jobs. 66% of the jobs are in the service sector, 31% in the workforce, and 1.5% are farmers. The unemployment rate amounted to 3% (2007), far below the national average.

Transportation
From the centre of Tuusula, Hyrylä, there are good bus connections to Helsinki, via the Tuusula motorway. There are also two train stations in the main railway line of Finland, Jokela and Nuppulinna. Nuppulinna, however, was discontinued in 2016.

Education
Tuusula's network of schools include:

18 primary schools
4 secondary schools
3 high schools
1 hospital school

See also
 For Tuusula
 Tuusula Highway

References

External links

 Municipality of Tuusula – official site

 
Greater Helsinki
Populated places established in 1643
1643 establishments in Sweden